Ibbotson is a surname. Notable people with the surname include:

Craig Ibbotson, rugby league footballer who played in the 2000s
David Ibbotson, pilot in the 2019 Piper PA-46 Malibu crash
Derek Ibbotson MBE (1932–2017), English runner who excelled in athletics in the 1950s
Diane Ibbotson (born 1946), English artist
Eva Ibbotson (1925–2010), Austrian-born British novelist, known for her children's books
Garrick Ibbotson (born 1988), Australian rules footballer in the Australian Football League
Henry Ibbotson (1816–1886), English botanist
Jimmy Ibbotson, American musician, member of the Nitty Gritty Dirt Band
Peter M. Ibbotson, philatelist awarded the Crawford Medal by the Royal Philatelic Society London
Richard Ibbotson KBE CB DSC (born 1954), former Royal Navy officer and Deputy Commander-in-Chief Fleet
Roger G. Ibbotson, professor of finance at Yale School of Management